The 1968 DFB-Pokal Final decided the winner of the 1967–68 DFB-Pokal, the 25th season of Germany's premier football cup. It was played on 9 June 1968 at the Südweststadion in Ludwigshafen.

Route to the final

Match

Details

References

External links
 Match report at kicker.de 
 Match report at WorldFootball.net
 Match report at Fussballdaten.de 

1. FC Köln matches
VfL Bochum matches
1967–68 in German football cups
1968
June 1968 sports events in Europe
Sport in Ludwigshafen
20th century in Ludwigshafen